A mobile office is an office built within a truck, motorhome, trailer or shipping container. The term is also used for people who don't work at a physical office location but instead carry their office materials with them.  The mobile office can allow businesses to cut costs and avoid building physical locations where it would be too costly or simply unnecessary.

See also
 Mobile home
 Virtual office

References

Office work
Construction
Portable buildings and shelters